Socotra Airport (Arabic:مطار سقطرى) is an airport in Socotra, Yemen . It is the only commercial airport that serves the Yemeni island of Socotra in the Arabian Sea and its capital town of Hadibu.

Overview
The most remote Yemeni airport, which was opened in 1999, has a weekly flight connecting the island with the mainland airport in Mukalla where an aircraft makes a technical stop on their route to Aden. The airport is located on the paved road that connects Hadibo on the northern coast with the main tourist attraction on the extreme west of the island, Qalansiyah beach. It takes about two hours to get from the airport to Qalansiyah. There is no scheduled transportation service between the airport and Hadibo, but it can be reached within a quarter of an hour by vehicle.

Flights were suspended in March 2015, due to Saudi Arabian-led intervention in Yemen and resumed in late 2018.

In April 2018, troops from the United Arab Emirates dismissed the Yemeni officials and took administrative control of the airport. On May of the same year, an agreement was reached between the United Arab Emirates and Yemen where control of the airport returned to the Yemeni authorities.

Airlines and destinations

References

Airports in Yemen
Airport